Academician Mikhail Aleksandrovich Fedonkin (born June 19, 1946) is a Russian paleontologist specializing in documentation of the earliest animals' body fossils, tracks, and trails. He has also described numerous Vendian-aged fossils including Hiemalora, Cephalonega, and Nimbia occlusa.

Early life 
Fedonkin was born in Orekhovo-Zuevo, Moscow Region, Russia.

In 1969, Fedonkin presented a thesis titled "Biostratigraphy and paleontology of the Late Precambrian deposits of Kharaulakh Mountains, Northern Yakutia (Sakha)" to earn his MSc in Geology from Moscow State University. He went on to obtain a PhD in Stratigraphy\Paleontology (1978) and a Doctorate of Science in Paleobiology (1985) from the Geological Institute, USSR Academy of Sciences, Moscow for his dissertations on "Precambrian fauna and trace fossils from the Russian Platform north" and "Non-skeletal fauna of the Vendian and its place in the evolution of metazoans", respectively.

Career 
In 1971, Dr. Fedonkin was a Junior Scientific Researcher at the Geological Institute, USSR Academy of Sciences, Moscow. In 1978, he became a Senior Scientific Researcher at the Paleontological Institute, USSR Academy of Sciences, Moscow.

In 1985 he was promoted to be the Lead Scientific Researcher.

Since 1992, Fedonkin has been the Head of the laboratory of Precambrian paleobiology at the Paleontological Institute of the Russian Academy of Sciences, Moscow.

Over his career he has completed field work in Australia, Canada, Norway, Poland, Russia, Spain and the United States.

Awards 
 1997, awarded the Charles Doolittle Walcott Medal by the National Academy of Sciences
 2000, awarded the Peter The Great Medal for the merits in the revival of science and economics in Russia by the International Academy of Science on Nature and Society.

Selected publications

Books 
 1981. White Sea Biota of the Vendian (Precambrian non-skeletal fauna of the Russian Platform north). Transactions of the Geological Institute, vol. 342. Moscow, Nauka, p. 1-100. (In Russian).
 1983. Organic World of the Vendian. Moscow, VINITI, p. 1-128. (In Russian).
 1987. Non-skeletal Fauna and Its Place in the Evolution of Metazoans. Transactions of the Paleontological Institute, vol. 226. Moscow, Nauka, p. 1-176. (In Russian).

Scientific publications 
 Fedonkin M.A. 1976. Traces of the multicellular animals from Valdai Series. Izvestiya Akademii Nauk SSSR, ser. geol., N 4, p. 128-132. (In Russian).
 Keller B.M. and Fedonkin M.A. 1977. New organic fossil finds in the Precambrian Valdai Series along the Syuz'ma River. Internat. Geol. Rev., 19(8), p. 924-930. (Translation of the previous paper).
 Fedonkin M.A. 1980. Early stages of evolution of Metazoa on the basis of the paleoichnological data. Zhurnal Obchei Biologii, N 2, c. 226-233. (In Russian, abstract in English).
 Fedonkin, M.A. 1990. Precambrian metazoans. In: Briggs, D.E.G. & Crowther, P.R., eds., Palaeobiology. A Synthesis. Blackwell Scientific Publ. Ltd., p. 17-24.
 Crimes T.P. and Fedonkin M.A. 1994. Evolution and dispersal of deepsea traces. Palaios, vol. 9, N 1, p. 74-83.
 Fedonkin M.A. 1996. Geobiological trends and events in the Precambrian biosphere. In: Walliser O.H. (ed.) Global Events and Event Stratigraphy in the Phanerozoic: Results of the International Interdisciplinary Cooperation in the IGCP-Project 216 "Global Biological Events in Earth History"). Springer-Verlag, Berlin, Heidelberg, pp. 89–112.
 Lipps J.H., Collins A.G. and Fedonkin M.A. 1998. Evolution of biological complexity: Evidence from geology, paleontology and molecular biology. In: Hoover R.B. (ed.) Instruments, Methods, and Missions for Astrobiology. Proceedings of the International Society for Optical Engineering, vol. 3441, p. 138-148.
 Fedonkin, M.A. and Ivantsov A. Yu. 2001. Faunal succession in the Vendian (Terminal Proterozoic) deposits of the White Sea Region, north of the Russian Platform. North American Paleontological Convention, Berkeley, California. Abstracts. P. 50.

References

External links 
 National Academy of Science Awards
 Fedonkin Curriculum Vitae
 Talk of Mikhail A. Fedonkin  at the Origins 2011 congress

1946 births
Living people
Russian paleontologists
Full Members of the Russian Academy of Sciences
Charles Doolittle Walcott Medal winners